Milton R. Sapirstein (1914 – November 28, 1996) was a clinical psychiatrist who studied, lectured, and wrote about the connections between neurobiology and psychoanalytical concepts. He was emeritus clinical professor of psychiatry at Mount Sinai Medical Center in New York City for nearly 50 years.

Works
Emotional Security (1948)
Paradoxes of Everyday Life (1953)
Paradoxes in the Modern Family (1996)

References

External links

1914 births
1996 deaths
American medical academics
American psychiatrists
20th-century American physicians